Asian Australians refers to Australians of Asian ancestry, including naturalised Australians who are immigrants from various regions in Asia and descendants of such immigrants. At the 2021 census, the proportion of the population identifying as Asian amounted to approximately 17.4 percent with breakdowns of 6.5 percent from Southern and Central Asia, 6.4 percent from North-East Asia, and 4.5 percent from South-East Asia.

Terminology 
The term "Asian Australian," was first used in the 1950s by European Australians who wanted to strengthen diplomatic and trade ties with Asia for the benefit of the Australian community. The term was not originally used to describe or recognise the experiences of people of Asian descent living in Australia. It was only in the late 1980s and 1990s that the term "Asian Australian" was adopted and used by Asian Australians themselves to discuss issues related to racial vilification and discrimination. Today, the term "Asian Australian" is widely accepted and used to refer to people of Asian descent who are citizens or residents of Australia, though its usage and meaning may vary within the Asian Australian community.

Census definition 
Information relating to the racial composition of the population was collected for the first time at the Census of 1911. The following were classified as "Asiatic":

At censuses prior to 1966 the instructions relating to race were insufficient to enable respondents to classify themselves according to the degree of racial mixture. As one report for the 1966 Census of Population and Housing details:

The Australian Bureau of Statistics and Australian Census no longer collects data on race as a standalone category. Instead, it collects information on distinct ancestries, of which census respondents can select up to two. For the purposes of aggregating data, the Australian Bureau of Statistics in its Australian Standard Classification of Cultural and Ethnic Groups (ASCCEG) has classified certain ancestries into categories, including:	
 North-East Asian (including Chinese, Koreans, Japanese, etc.);
 South-East Asian (including Vietnamese, Filipinos, Indonesians, etc.); and
 Southern and Central Asian (including Indians, Sri Lankans, Afghans, etc.).

Given that ancestry is the primary statistical measure of ethnicity or cultural origins in Australia, and that the different ancestry groups may have distinct histories, cultures, and geographical origins, information on Australians with ancestry from Asia is found at the respective articles for each separate article (e.g. Chinese Australian, Indian Australian, etc.)

Notably, Australians of Middle Eastern ancestries are not classified as part of the Asian category under the ASCCEG and are separately classified under North African and Middle Eastern. This includes Australians of Arab, Turkish and Iranian ancestries, but Armenians, for example, are classified as Central Asian and therefore part of the Asian category.

History

Gold rush

Chinese immigration to Australia increased significantly during the Victorian gold rush in the 1850s and 1860s. While some Chinese arrived in Australia as early as 1818, Chinese immigration increased dramatically during the gold rush. Conflict arose between Chinese and Australian communities due to prejudice and misunderstanding, leading to riots at Lambing Flat and Buckland. Anti-Chinese laws enacted by Australian colonies were the precursor to the White Australia policy in 1901-1973.

Afghan cameleers 
During the period from the 1860s to 1900, small groups of cameleers, mostly from British India but also from Afghanistan, Egypt, and Turkey, were shipped in and out of Australia on three-year contracts to service the inland pastoral industry. These workers, who were commonly referred to as "Afghans" or "Ghans", were responsible for carting goods and transporting wool bales by camel train. Most of the cameleers were Muslims, with a sizeable minority being Sikhs from the Punjab region. They established camel-breeding stations and rest house outposts, known as caravanserai, throughout inland Australia, creating a permanent link between the coastal cities and remote cattle and sheep grazing stations. This practice continued until around the 1930s, when the cameleers were largely replaced by automobiles.

Immigration restriction

In the 1870s and 1880s, the trade union movement protested against foreign labour, particularly Asian labour. The union movement was critical of Asian workers, especially Chinese workers, who did not join unions and were willing to work for lower wages and conditions. Landowners in rural areas argued that Asian workers were necessary for development in tropical Queensland and the Northern Territory.  Without Asian workers, these regions would allegedly be abandoned. In response to union pressure, legislation was passed between 1875 and 1888 to exclude further Chinese and Asian immigration.

Internment during WWII 
During WWII, Japanese and Taiwanese from various locations were interned in Tatura and Rushworth, two towns in Victoria, due to government policies. Roughly 600 Taiwanese civilians, including entire families, were held at "Internment Camp No. 4" in Rushworth, between January 1942 and March 1946. Most Japanese and Taiwanese were arrested for racist reasons. Some Japanese and Taiwanese people were born in the camp and received birth certificates. During internment, some adults operated businesses and schools in the camp. Filipinos, Koreans, Manchus,  New Caledonians, New Hebrideans, and people from various locations were also held at the camp, as well as mixed-Japanese Aboriginal Australians. Schools mainly taught English, Japanese, Mandarin and Taiwanese languages (Hokkien, Hakka, Formosan).

Repatriation after WWII 
After the war, internees were resettled in their country of ethnic origin, with the exception of Japanese Australians. Non-Australian Japanese were repatriated to Japan, while Taiwanese were repatriated to Occupied Taiwan. The repatriation caused public outcry due to the poor living conditions on the ship, known as the "Yoizuki Hellship scandal". The government wanted to expel non-citizen Japanese internees, including most Taiwanese. Many believed the Taiwanese should be seen as citizens of the ROC and allies, not expelled under poor conditions. This debate further inflamed outrage at the treatment of Taiwanese internees, and there was a minor controversy regarding the destination of repatriation for some Taiwanese internees. Despite public pressure, the Australian government ultimately deported most Taiwanese internees.

Post-war immigration

The government began to expand access to citizenship for non-Europeans and increase immigration numbers from non-European countries in the 1950s and 1960s. In 1973, the prime minister dismantled White Australia and implemented a more non-discriminatory immigration policy.

In 1957, the government allowed access to citizenship for 15-year residents. In 1958, the Migration Act was reformed to allow skilled and professional non-Europeans to immigrate and temporarily reside in the country. During the Fraser government, the country experienced the largest intake of Asian immigrants since the 1850s and 1860s due to an increase in Vietnamese refugees after the Vietnam War. In 1983, British immigration was lower than Asian immigration for the first time in Australian history. Overall, immigration policy has evolved towards non-discrimination and broadening pathways to citizenship for Asians, following the dismantling of European-only policies.

Notable contributions

Arts and entertainment 

Asian Australians have been involved in the entertainment industry since the first half of the 19th century.

Sports 

Asian Australians have contributed to sports in Australia through much of the 20th Century. Some of the most notable contributions include Olympic sports, but also in professional sports, particularly in the post-World War II years. As the Asian Australian population grew in the late 20th century, Asian Australian contributions expanded to more sports. Examples of female Asian American athletes include Lisa Sthalekar,  Catriona Bisset, Alexandra Huynh, Setyana Mapasa, Priscilla Hon, and Cheltzie Lee. Examples of male Asian Australian athletes include Jason Day, Massimo Luongo, Geoff Huegill, Usman Khawaja, Peter Bell, and Martin Lo.

Data Collection and Demographics

Overview 
The Australian government collects data on distinct ancestries rather than race at each census, and at the 2021 census, approximately 17.4 percent of the population identified as having Asian ancestry.

At the 2021 census, the most commonly nominated Asian ancestries were as set out in the following table.

Details 
Thirty percent of Asian Australians go to university, 20 percent of all Australian doctors are Asian, and 37 percent of Asian Australians participate in some form of organised sport. Chinese and Indian Australians, particularly second and third generation immigrants, are present in large numbers in Sydney and Melbourne, with Chinese Australians constituting Sydney's fourth largest ancestry group.

Political Representation 

Members of minority groups make up about 6 percent of the federal Parliament. Both Labor and Greens voters were more likely to agree that Asian Australians experience discrimination, but more than three-quarters of those who said they would vote for the Liberal/National Coalition also agreed.

Social and political issues

Discrimination and violence against Asian Australians 
Asian Australians have faced discrimination and violence based on their race and ethnicity. Some Sikh Australians have experienced discrimination due to their religious garments being mistaken for those worn by Arabs or Muslims, particularly after the September 11 attacks.

COVID-19 pandemic 
The COVID-19 pandemic has led to an increase in anti-Asian sentiment in Australia.

Racial stereotypes 

There are racial stereotypes that exist towards Asian Australians. Some Anglo-Celtic Australians view Asian Australians as "perpetual foreigners" and not as truly "Australian," a sentiment also present in other English-speaking countries such as Canada, New Zealand, and the United States.

Model minority 

The term "model minority" refers to a minority group whose members are perceived to have achieved a higher level of socio-economic success than the population average. In the case of Asian Australians, this stereotype is often applied to groups such as Chinese Australians, Indian Australians, and Korean Australians. While it is true that some members of these groups have achieved success in education and income, it is important to note that the model minority stereotype is a oversimplification that ignores the diversity and challenges faced by individuals within these groups.

Bamboo ceiling 

The bamboo ceiling is a term used to describe the barriers that prevent Asian Australians from achieving leadership positions in the workplace. Despite making up 9.3 percent of the Australian labour force, Asian Australians are significantly underrepresented in senior executive positions, with only 4.9 percent achieving these roles. This disparity is often attributed to unconscious bias and discrimination within the workplace.

Disparities among Asian Australians 
There are social and economic disparities among Asian Australians. While Asian Australians are over-represented in high-performing schools and university courses, some ethnic groups face challenges. For example, Cambodian Australians have lower rates of educational qualifications and higher participation in semi-skilled and unskilled occupations compared to the general Australian population. Laotian Australians also have lower rates of higher non-school qualifications and higher unemployment rates compared to the total Australian population. Vietnamese Australians have slightly lower participation in the labor force and higher unemployment rates compared to the national average. Hmong Australians have historically had high unemployment rates and a large proportion in unskilled factory jobs, though this has improved somewhat in recent years.

In contrast, Bangladeshi Australians have higher educational levels and a higher participation in skilled managerial, professional, or trade occupations compared to the total Australian population.

See also

 Asian Americans
 Asian Argentines
 Asian Canadians
 Asian Brazilians
 Asian New Zealanders
 Asian Peruvians
 Asian South Africans
 Asian French
 Asian people
 British Asian
 East Asians in the United Kingdom

Notes

References

External links
Chinese Museum Chinese Immigration to Australia
Young Asians making their mark on Australia
4A Centre for Contemporary Asian Art
Asian Migration to Australia
Racism and Intolerance in Australia
Asianising Australia
Indian Migration to Australia